Joseph Thrasher is an American football coach and former player.  He is currently the head football coach at the Hartfield Academy in Flowood, Mississippi. Previously Thrasher served as head coach at Bacone College from 2006 to 2008 and Belhaven University from 2009 to 2013.

Coaching career

Bacone
Thrasher was the second head football coach for the Bacone Warriors located in Muskogee, Oklahoma and he held that position for three seasons, from 2006 until 2008.  His coaching record at Bacone was 13–19.

Belhaven
In 2009, Thrasher became the fifth head football coach for the Belhaven Blazers located in Jackson, Mississippi.  His coaching record at Belhaven is 24–31.

Head coaching record

College

References

External links
 Belhaven profile

Year of birth missing (living people)
Living people
Bacone Warriors football coaches
Belhaven Blazers football coaches
Belhaven Blazers football players
High school football coaches in Mississippi